The David McCullough Bridge, commonly and historically known as the 16th Street Bridge, is a steel trussed through arch bridge that spans the Allegheny River in Pittsburgh, Pennsylvania.

The 16th Street Bridge replaced the Mechanics Street Bridge which had been completed at the behest of the State of Pennsylvania in 1838. The bridge was listed on the National Register of Historic Places in 1979. The 16th Street Bridge is one of the more popular bridges in the city of Pittsburgh and provides easy access to the Strip District and the North Shore.

Days after the disastrous St. Patrick's Day Flood of 1936, reports spread on March 20 that the bridge had collapsed from the pressure of the receding flood waters and debris, prompting Pittsburgh Police Chief Jacob Dorsey to close all city bridges for fear of receding waters and debris weakening or collapsing them.  However, the reports were soon discovered to be false.

On July 7, 2013, the structure was named in honor of historian, author, and commentator David McCullough, a Pittsburgh native, in a bridge ceremony sponsored by Heinz History Center.

See also 

List of crossings of the Allegheny River
National Register of Historic Places listings in Pittsburgh, Pennsylvania

References

External links 

16th Street Bridge at pghbridges.com
Post-Gazette feature

McCullough
Bridges over the Allegheny River
Road bridges on the National Register of Historic Places in Pennsylvania
Bridges completed in 1923
Through arch bridges in the United States
Towers in Pennsylvania
Pittsburgh History & Landmarks Foundation Historic Landmarks
National Register of Historic Places in Pittsburgh
1923 establishments in Pennsylvania